Theorosa's Bridge is located west of 109th Street North and Meridian between the towns of Sedgwick and Valley Center in Kansas, United States.  Over the years, it has burned down and been rebuilt.  There are several versions of haunted urban legend, but none have been confirmed historically or otherwise.

References

Buildings and structures in Sedgwick County, Kansas
Children's street culture
Concrete bridges in the United States
Iron bridges in the United States
Reportedly haunted locations in Kansas
Road bridges in Kansas
Wooden bridges in the United States